Emily Ann Fox (born July 5, 1998) is an American professional soccer player who plays as a defender for North Carolina Courage of the National Women's Soccer League (NWSL) and the United States national team. She played college soccer for the North Carolina Tar Heels.

College career
In 2017, Fox started the first thirteen games of her freshman season with the Tar Heels before suffering a torn ACL and missed the remainder of the season. She was named to the third team All-ACC and the All-Freshman Team in 2017.

In 2018, Fox returned to the starting lineup, and at one point started eighteen straight games. Due to her call-up to the USWNT in November 2018, Fox missed the ACC Tournament Semi-Finals and Final as well as the first round of the NCAA Tournament. North Carolina made it all the way to the Final of the 2018 College Cup, where they lost 1–0 to Florida State. Fox was named to the 2018 first-team All-ACC.

Club career 
Fox played more minutes than any other NWSL rookie in 23 appearances for Racing Louisville FC. The outside back led the league in interceptions, with 115, and was a finalist for the NWSL Rookie of the Year award.

Ahead of the 2022 season, Fox was named as one of Racing's four team captains.

International career

Youth National Team
In 2015, Fox was named to the roster for the 2015 CONCACAF Women's U-20 Championship. She scored a goal in the opening game of the tournament, a 2–2 draw vs Mexico. Fox appeared in every game of the tournament, as the U.S captured their fifth CONCACAF Women's U-20 Championship. Fox was named to the squad for the 2016 FIFA U-20 Women's World Cup, she appeared in all six games for the U.S as they finished fourth in the tournament.

Fox didn't participate in the 2018 CONCACAF Women's U-20 Championship as she was still recovering from her ACL injury. She recovered in time to be named to roster for 2018 FIFA U-20 Women's World Cup, she was one of three players to return for a second U-20 World Cup. Fox appeared in one game at the 2018 U-20 World Cup, as the U.S failed to advance to the knockout stage.

Senior National Team
Fox received her first call-up to the senior national team in November 2018 for a set of friendlies in Europe. She earned her first cap on November 8, 2018 when she got the start at right back against Portugal. Fox was also in the starting lineup five days later against Scotland.

Fox was originally only named as a practice player for the USWNT training cap ahead of the 2019 SheBelieves Cup, but after Danielle Colaprico had to withdraw from the squad due to injury, Fox was added to the roster.

Career statistics

International

Honors
United States

 CONCACAF Women's Championship: 2022

 SheBelieves Cup: 2022, 2023
Individual
 NWSL Team of the Month: May 2021

References

External links
 
 North Carolina Tar Heels profile

1998 births
Living people
Soccer players from Virginia
People from Ashburn, Virginia
American women's soccer players
United States women's under-20 international soccer players
United States women's international soccer players
Women's association football defenders
Women's association football fullbacks
North Carolina Tar Heels women's soccer players
Racing Louisville FC players
Racing Louisville FC draft picks
National Women's Soccer League players